Smyadovo Municipality is a municipality (obshtina) in Shumen Province, Northeastern Bulgaria, located in the vicinity of the northern slopes of the Eastern Stara planina mountain to the area of the so-called Fore-Balkan. It is named after its administrative centre - the town of Smyadovo.

Settlements 

Smyadovo Municipality includes the following 10 places (towns are shown in bold):

Demography 
The following table shows the change of the population during the last four decades.

Ethnic composition
According to the 2011 census, among those who answered the optional question on ethnic identification, the ethnic composition of the municipality was the following:

See also
Provinces of Bulgaria
Municipalities of Bulgaria
List of cities and towns in Bulgaria

References

External links
 Official website 

Municipalities in Shumen Province